The 2018 Turkish Basketball Presidential Cup was the 34th edition of the Turkish Basketball Presidential Cup. The game was played between Fenerbahçe Doğuş, champions of the 2017–18 Basketbol Süper Ligi, and Anadolu Efes, the winners of the 2018 Turkish Cup.

Anadolu Efes made their 22nd appearance and won their 11th championship, while this was Fenerbahçe's 15th President's Cup final.

Venue

Match details 
Doğuş Balbay, who had 13 points, 5 rebounds and 3 assists in the game, was named the Presidential Cup MVP.

References 

Presidents Cup
2018
Turkish Cup 2018